Abramson is a variation of a patronymic surname, meaning "son of Abram (or Abraham)", the Biblical figure. It is most prevalent among American Jews. People named "Abramson" include:

 Abraham Abramson (1752 or 1754–1811), Prussian coiner
 Arthur S. Abramson (1925–2017), American linguist and speech scientist
 David Abramson (fl. 1970s–2020s), Australian engineer
 Doris E. Abramson (died 2008), American professor, author, editor, and bookstore proprietor
 Frederick B. Abramson (1935–1991), African-American lawyer
 George Abramson (1903–1985), American football player
 Harold Alexander Abramson (1899–1980), American psychiatrist
 H. Norman Abramson {1926-2022), American engineer and scientist
 Herb Abramson (1916–1999), American record company executive and producer
 Ivan Abramson (1869–1934), Russian-born American director of silent films active in the 1910s and 1920s
 Jerry Abramson (born 1946), American politician and mayor of Louisville, Kentucky, United States
 Jill Abramson (born 1954), American journalist and managing editor of The New York Times
 Josh Abramson (born 1981), co-founder of CollegeHumor
 Lee Abramson (born 1970), American musician and Presidential candidate
 Leslie Abramson (born c. 1944), American criminal defense attorney
 Leonard Abramson (born 1932), American businessman and founder of U.S. Healthcare
 Lyn Yvonne Abramson (born 1950), American psychology professor
 Maria Entraigues-Abramson (fl. 2000s–2010s), Argentinian singer
 Marion Abramson (1905–1965), American civic leader
 Mark Abramson (1934–2007), American record producer
 Matanya Abramson (1920–2004), Israeli sculptor
 Max Abramson (born 1976), New Hampshire politician
 Norman Abramson (1932–2020), American engineer
 Paul R. Abramson (political scientist) (1937–2018), American political scientist
 Ronney Abramson, Canadian singer-songwriter

See also 
 Per Abramsen (born 1941), Dutch sculptor
 Joel Abromson (1938–2002), American politician
 Abrahamson (American, Swedish)
 Abrahamsen (Danish, Dutch, Norwegian)
 Abrahamsson (Norwegian, Swedish)
 Abrams (disambiguation)

References

Jewish surnames
Patronymic surnames